The 1896 Stanford football team represented Stanford University in the 1896 college football season and was coached by Harry P. Cross in the first of his two nonconsecutive seasons with the team. He returned to coach again in 1898. Like the two coaches who preceded him, Cross played football at Yale.

Schedule

References

Stanford
Stanford Cardinal football seasons
Stanford football